The Leadville Trail 100 MTB is the second oldest of the well-known  marathon mountain bike races held in the United States, the oldest being the Wilderness 101 in Central PA.  The Leadville Trail 100 MTB was first run in 1994 and has become one of the best marketed, attended and known marathon events in mountain bike racing.  

Entry to the event is controlled and restricted. Some entries are awarded by a random lottery, while other entries are awarded by finishing well in a series of qualifying events. Lottery entries are due by the end of December for the race that is run the second Saturday in August. Qualifying events are similar to the Leadville 100 race but shorter, typically around 100 km in length. Courses for qualifying events typically cover similar terrain (roads, dirt roads, gravel roads and mild trails) with similar vertical elevation gains (~100 feet per 1 mile).

History
The Leadville Trail 100 MTB race is an outgrowth of the Leadville Trail 100 footrace. Both races were begun by Ken Chlouber as part of an effort to spur the economy of the town of Leadville after a local mine that employed many residents closed (the Climax mine). The mountain bike race was the idea of Tony Post, then a marketing vice president at the Rockport Company, sponsor of the event who arranged for television coverage for both races. The first mountain bike race drew just 150 entrants, while the 2009 edition allowed 1400 entrants. The race has continued to grow and to allow more entrants. In 2010, the event was purchased by Life Time Fitness. In 2019, there were 1,644 racers.

Course
The course includes five major climbs: St Kevins, Sugarloaf, Columbine, Powerline, and Turquoise Lake Road. Total elevation gain is approximately  when verified by GPS tracks of past competitors. There are six aid stations on the course, at Pipeline, Twin Lakes Dam, Columbine Mine, Twin Lakes Dam, Pipeline, and Carter Summit.

Cutoff Times
Racers must checkout of aid stations prior to cutoff times. These times place limits on the amount of time racers have to finish a course leg. They are found in the Leadville Trail 100 MTB Athlete Guide and also in the event schedule on the website.

Riders must check out of each aid station prior to the cut-off times. Failure to do so will end the racer's competitive time and result in a did not finish (DNF) race result status. In the final leg toward the race finish, racers must finish prior to a 9-hour cutoff time to qualify for the "big buckle" and a 12-hour cutoff time for completion and to qualify for the "small buckle".

Cutoff Times

Notable Racers
Between 2003 and 2008, David Wiens, a 2000 inductee to the Mountain Bike Hall of Fame, won the race each year. In 2007, Wiens broke the 7 hour mark for the first time at 6:58:46  while holding off Floyd Landis by just under 2 minutes. In 2008, Wiens won again beating Lance Armstrong by just under 2 minutes and setting a new course record of 6:45:45 . In 2009, Armstrong returned winning and establishing a new course record of 6:28:50.9. Armstrong's involvement with the race brought increased attention to the Leadville Trail 100 MTB, evidenced by the fact that race organizers offered a live webcast for purchase beginning in 2009. In 2010, Armstrong was unable to return due to injury, but his Team RadioShack teammate Levi Leipheimer, riding in his first mountain bike race, won and set a new course record of 6:16:37. In the 2010 women's race, two-time winner Rebecca Rusch also broke the course record, which had stood since 1997. In 2011, a conflict with the Tour of Utah kept Leipheimer away, but U.S. national cross-country bike champion Todd Wells turned in the second-fastest time ever to win, 6:23:38, while Rusch won the women's race again and shaved over 15 minutes off her previous record, with 7:31:46.

Winners

Men's winner

Women's winner

See also 
 Leadville Trail 100 is an ultramarathon running race.

References

External links
 LeadvilleRaceSeries.com - Official website of the Leadville Trail 100 Mile MTB
 Leadville MTB 100 2011 - 2011 Leadville Trail 100 MTB Strava Segment

Mountain biking events in the United States
Sports in Colorado
Recurring sporting events established in 1994
1994 establishments in Colorado
Lake County, Colorado